"Get Him Back" is a song written by American singer Fiona Apple and produced by Mike Elizondo and Brian Kehew for her third album Extraordinary Machine (2005). It was released as a promotional CD single only to triple-A radio as the album's fourth single on February 6, 2006 (see 2006 in music).

In 2003 Extraordinary Machine, which was originally produced by Jon Brion, was submitted to Sony Music executives, who were reportedly unenthusiastic about the finished product and shelved it. On February 26, 2005 radio DJ Andrew Harms at 107.7 The End in Seattle began playing previously unheard tracks from a bootleg copy of Extraordinary Machine, and before long, poor quality copies of "Not about Love", "Get Him Back" and "Used to Love Him" were circulating on the internet. Soon after, CD-quality versions of all the tracks were released through the BitTorrent website TorrentBox. An extensively reworked version of Extraordinary Machine, co-produced by Mike Elizondo and Brian Kehew, was released in October 2005.

The Chicago Tribune published a track-by-track comparison of the leaked and official versions of the album, and wrote of "Get Him Back": "Brion's drum fills are more pronounced and strings underscore the vocals, while the Roots' Ahmir Thompson gives the Elizondo-Kehew version a more linear groove." Blender magazine ranked the official version of the song at number thirty-five on its list of "The 100 Greatest Songs of 2005", and a "205 Best Songs to Download from 2005" article in the New York Post placed it at number thirty.

Formats & track listing 

Acetate promo CD single:
1. Get Him Back (Radio Edit)
2. Get Him Back (Album Version)

Personnel
Piano by Fiona Apple
Drums by Ahmir "Questlove" Thompson
Moog bass by Mike Elizondo
Keyboards by Keefus Ciancia

Notes

External links
Lyrics

2006 singles
Fiona Apple songs
2005 songs
Songs written by Fiona Apple
Song recordings produced by Mike Elizondo
Epic Records singles